Jhulna  is a village in Narayanpur district of Chhattisgarh state of India.

References

Villages in Narayanpur district